Colyaer SL is a Spanish aircraft manufacturer based in Portonovo that was founded in 1995. The company specializes in the design and manufacture of kit aircraft.

In 2015 the Colyaer Freedom S100 and the Colyaer Martin3 S100 were marketed by Galicia Avionica SL.

Aircraft

References

External links

Aircraft manufacturers of Spain